Sphaeriestes is a genus of narrow-waisted bark beetles in the family Salpingidae. There are about 13 described species in Sphaeriestes.

Species
These 13 species belong to the genus Sphaeriestes:

 Sphaeriestes aeratus (Mulsant, 1859)
 Sphaeriestes alternatus (LeConte, 1859)
 Sphaeriestes bimaculatus (Gyllenhal, 1810)
 Sphaeriestes borbonicus Seidlitz, 1886
 Sphaeriestes castaneus (Panzer, 1796)
 Sphaeriestes cribarius (Fairmaire, 1898)
 Sphaeriestes exsanguis (Abeille de Perrin, 1870)
 Sphaeriestes impressus (Wollaton, 1857)
 Sphaeriestes reyi (Abeille de Perrin, 1874)
 Sphaeriestes sculptilis Fairmaire, 1868
 Sphaeriestes stockmanni (Biström, 1977)
 Sphaeriestes tibialis (LeConte, 1866)
 Sphaeriestes virescens LeConte, 1850

References

Further reading

External links

 

Salpingidae
Articles created by Qbugbot